The Borcut is a right tributary of the river Săsar in Romania. It flows into the Săsar near the village Săsar, west of Baia Mare.

References

Rivers of Romania
Rivers of Maramureș County